The Nokia N82 is a high-end smartphone produced by Nokia, and announced on 14 November 2007 as part of the company's Nseries line. The N82 runs Symbian OS v9.2 (S60 3rd Edition, FP1). The N82 inherits much of the Nokia N95's features and specifications (including GPS, Wi-Fi and HSDPA), with the major addition being its xenon flash. At the time the N82 was considered one of the most sophisticated camera phone on the market. It is also considered a successor to the Nokia N95, preceding the Nokia N96.

Like the N95 before it, the Nokia N82 was critically acclaimed and is often considered one of the best Symbian devices, although it did not sell as much and was not available worldwide. The N82 was Nokia's last high-end device in a candybar form, as its successors opted for sliders and later touchscreen devices.

As a camera phone, the Nokia N82 primarily competes with Sony Ericsson's K800 and K850.

History
Nokia's N82 model was leaked in May 2007 (along with Nokia N81), but was not made official until six months later in November. It was introduced a month after the Nokia N95 8GB.

The latest firmware of the Nokia N82 is v35.0.002 released December 2009.

The N86 8MP from 2009 (a slider) is considered to be the N82's spiritual successor due to its high-end camera technology, despite the lack of Xenon flash. However a similar top-of-the-line device in a candybar form never appeared from Nokia after the N82. The Nokia 6220 classic of 2008 was the second Nokia with a Xenon flash.

Features
The N82 includes a built-in accelerometer for video stabilisation and photo orientation to keep landscape or portrait shots oriented as taken, and automatic 270 degree screen rotation. It is compatible with the N-Gage gaming platform. It has a 2.4-inch TFT display and features the same 332 MHz processor as found in the N95.

The N82 has almost identical specifications with the N95, leading to it being called by some as an "N95 in candybar form." Apart from the xenon camera flash addition, minor technologic differences between the models are: 128 MB RAM up from 64 MB (the N95's 8GB variant also had 128 MB); CIF resolution (352x288) front camera up from QVGA (320 × 240); microUSB port rather than miniUSB; and removal of the infrared port.

Camera
The first Nokia phone with xenon flash, the N82 has a 5-megapixel camera with Carl Zeiss optics, and was considered the best camera phone on the market until the arrival of the Samsung GT-i8510.

Discussions and head-to-head comparisons of these two models demonstrate the N86 8MP from 2009, which is equipped with dual LED flash, is not consistently capable of outperforming the N82 in variable lighting. The primary advantage of using LED is light source for video recording, whereas the xenon flash has a stronger burst of light, but it cannot be used for recording videos due to its technical composition.

Variants
The mainland China market version of the N82 has a different hardware platform which has Wi-Fi and the UMTS radio removed (no 3G support), has a different product code (RM-314 as opposed to RM-313) and its firmware is incompatible with the regular model's. This version can be readily identified by the lack of "WLAN scanning" display on the idle screen.

Specifications

See also 
Nseries
Sony Ericsson K850i
LG Viewty
Samsung G800
Nokia N78

References

External links 

Nokia N82 | Official Website
 Nokia N82 | Device Details
 Nokia N82 | Technical Specifications
Nokia N82 | GSM Arena Review

N-Gage (service) compatible devices
Mobile phones introduced in 2007
Nokia Nseries